The Warrior-class inshore patrol vessel is a class of multi-mission inshore patrol vessels (MMIPVs) built for the South African Navy, and are intended to replace the Warrior-class OPVs between 2022 and 2024. All three vessels are named after historical South African 'warriors' who had a significant impact on the development of the country.

Development 
Since the Strategic Defence Package of 1999, the South African Navy had always envisaged replacing the ageing Warrior-class strike craft with more modern alternatives, especially when wanting to improve its efficiency in policing the country's extensive maritime exclusive economic zone (1.5 million km). In 2011, it was hoped that nine Offshore Patrol Vessels (OPVs) would be constructed as a like-for-like replacement for the previous strike craft. Practical experience in the rough seas of the Cape had tended to favour the larger OPVs, as well as the vessels having the potential ability to operate helicopters from their flight deck.

In 2013 it was announced that the SA Navy had the ambition of domestically constructing three offshore, and a miniumum of six (later reduced to three) inshore patrol vessels, in what would be term Project Biro. However, as a result of financial implicatations, in 2018 it was confirmed that only the three Multi-Mission Inshore Patrol Vessels (MMIPVs) would be granted funding, at a cost of R3.6 billion ($288m).

Whilst the introduction of three highly modern IPVs will play a crucial and immediate role in maritime law enforcement, it has been regretted by analysts that the OPV option was not also financially feasible due to the significant upscaling of capability available.

Design and Construction
The Warrior-class is based upon the highly successful Damen Stan Patrol 6211 and is designed with the patented Sea Axe Hull - the first to operate in South Africa. The straight-edged bow will improve safety and comfort when operating in the rough seas found off South Africa, as well as significantly reducing fuel consumption and emissions. The design of the vessel ensures low sea resistance, high sustained speed in waves and superior sea keeping characteristics. Vertical accelerations are reduced significantly, and bow slamming is almost eliminated, thus notably increasing the safety of the vessel and of the crew.

The 62m by 11m vessels, weighing 750 tons, have a range of 2000 nm when at an economical 20 knots. The vessels will be powered by four Caterpillar 3512C HD/B engines, delivering 5 700 kW (7 644) hp and driving four fixed pitch propellers. They will also each have two stabilisers and two bow thrusters. The class has a maximum speed of 26.5 knots and a maximum range of 4000 nm.

Equipped with radar, combat management systems, a forward gun position and various heavy machine guns, the class also carry two RHIBs for boarding operations, with the aft deck being designed to accommodate various container arrangements that aid unique mission requirements. Deck layout includes a knuckle boom crane, single point lifting davit rated at 5.7 tons and a single point lifting davit rated at 2 tons. The vessels can accommodate up to 14 non-crew, primarily for boarding or landing parties, and will work closely with the Maritime Reaction Squadron in the law-enforcemant role.

In 2018, Damen Shipyards Cape Town (DSCT) secured the order from Armscor for the delivery of three inshore patrol vessels, with an open-ended option for a possible fourth, beating competition from Durban based Southern African Shipyards (SAS) and a Nautic Africa/Austal partnership. In February 2019, DSCT ceremonially laid the keel for the first MMIPV, SAS King Sekhukhune I, and formally delivered the vessel to the SA Navy three years later in May 2022. Delivery dates for the final two vessels are scheduled for June 2023 and September 2024, with the timetable slipping slightly due to COVID-19.

DSCT has exceeded Project Biro's 60% local content requirements by issuing contracts to a large number of local suppliers and as a result of their work on Project Biro, many of these suppliers are now earmarked for work on Damen projects in and outside of South Africa.

The project has created over 300 direct jobs by DSCT, and also supports another 1000 indirect jobs. DSCT states that the project has played an important role in creating skilled employment in South Africa, and has acted as a catalyst for the development of regional supply chains.

Capabilities and Features 
The Warrior-class IPVs are multi-role designed and will be employed in a wide range of missions, such as mine counter-measures, deep diving training, search and rescue, submarine torpedo recovery, humanitarian assistance and anti-pollution tasks -  particularly key constabulary roles such as intercepting illegal trafficking, fishing and counter-piracy.

The MMIPVs' main armament is the Reutech 20 mm Super Rogue remotely controlled gun, with heavy machine guns mounted on the bridge wings. Their primary sensor is the Reutech Radar Systems RTS 3200: a frequency-modulated continuous-wave radar/optronics tracker (FORT) that was previously trialled aboard the frigate SAS Spioenkop. Reutech is also providing the communications system, which will be LINK-ZA compatible, alongside other Communication Intercept and passive Close-In Surveillance systems.

Their ability to accommodate at short notice containerised mission modules gives them a true multi-mission capability. Container fittings on the aft deck will be available for fastening on mission equipment. Various layouts are accommodated, including one 20 foot and four 10 foot containers.

The vessels will carry one 7m and one 9m rigid-hull inflatable boat for boarding operations.

Operational Deployment 
SAS King Sekhukhune I was commissioned into service and formally christened at a service at Salisbury Island, Durban Harbour in June 2022. Delivered to the Navy in May 2022 by DSCT, King Sekhukhune I spent the following month working up before moving to Naval Base Durban, the home of the newly formed patrol squadron.

Ships in Class

References

Ships of the South African Navy